Anelaphus villosus, the twig pruner, is a species in the longhorn beetle family Cerambycidae. It is found in the eastern half of the United States and southeastern Canada.

The species Anelaphus parallelus has been determined to be a taxonomic synonym of Anelaphus villosus. They are now considered the same species under the name Anelaphus villosus.

References

Further reading

 

Anelaphus
Beetles described in 1792